Zdravko "Pusko" Ježić (17 August 1931 – 19 June 2005) was a Croatian chemist and water polo player. He was part of the Yugoslav team that won silver medals at the 1952 and 1956 Olympics and placed fourth in 1960.

In 1958 Ježić received a degree in chemical technology from the University of Zagreb, and in 1960 started working for chemical industry. In 1962 he defended a PhD in organic chemical technology, and then spent a few years as a postdoctoral student at the University of Michigan. From 1966 until his retirement in 1992 he developed polymeric materials at Dow Chemical Company in the United States. He co-authored numerous scientific and technical papers and 13 patents. As a U.S. citizen, Ježić appeared in an Olympic-themed commercial for Dow Chemical during the 1988 Olympics.

Ježić died in New York City in 2005. In 2010, he was inducted into the International Swimming Hall of Fame.

See also
 List of Olympic medalists in water polo (men)
 List of members of the International Swimming Hall of Fame

References

External links

 

1931 births
2005 deaths
Sportspeople from Niš
Croatian male water polo players
Yugoslav male water polo players
Olympic water polo players of Yugoslavia
Water polo players at the 1952 Summer Olympics
Water polo players at the 1956 Summer Olympics
Water polo players at the 1960 Summer Olympics
Olympic silver medalists for Yugoslavia
Olympic medalists in water polo
Dow Chemical Company employees
Medalists at the 1956 Summer Olympics
Medalists at the 1952 Summer Olympics
University of Michigan fellows